The canton of Cergy-1 is an administrative division of the Val-d'Oise department, Île-de-France region, northern France. It was created at the French canton reorganisation which came into effect in March 2015. Its seat is in Cergy.

It consists of the following communes:
Cergy (partly)
Osny
Puiseux-Pontoise

References

Cantons of Val-d'Oise